The Green and Liberal Alliance was a green political party in Luxembourg.  It was led by Jup Weber, who was instrumental in founding the Greens and had been one of Luxembourg's six Members of the European Parliament.

It contested the 1999 election to the Chamber of Deputies.  It recorded 1.1% of the vote nationwide, coming sixth in all four constituencies and not winning a seat.  It has since disbanded.

References

1990s establishments in Luxembourg
1999 disestablishments in Luxembourg
Defunct political parties in Luxembourg
Green political parties in Luxembourg
Green liberalism